D. Pedro Paulo de Figueiredo da Cunha e Melo (18 June 1770 – 31 December 1855) was an important Portuguese prelate of the nineteenth century who was also, at one point, elected Member of Parliament for Beira. He was created a Cardinal by Pope Pius IX in 1850, after which he was better known as Cardinal Figueiredo (Cardeal Figueiredo).

Biography
Pedro Paulo de Figueiredo da Cunha e Melo studied in the University of Coimbra, where he acquired a doctorate in utroque iuris. He was Primarius cathedraticus, teaching law at the University.

In the 1826 general election, he was elected Member of Parliament for the province of Beira.

At a time he was only a subdeacon, Figueiredo da Cunha e Melo was named Archbishop of Braga by the Portuguese Government, and the choice was confirmed by Pope Gregory XVI on 3 April 1843, and was consecrated on 10 September, by the bishop of Santiago do Cabo Verde, Jerónimo do Barco.

He was created cardinal priest in the consistory of 30 September 1850, but died before receiving the red hat and title.

He died on 31 December 1855 at the age of 85.

References

External links
The Cardinals of the Holy Roman Church
Catholic Hierarchy 
GCatholic

1770 births
1855 deaths
People from Coimbra
19th-century Portuguese cardinals
Cardinals created by Pope Pius IX
Roman Catholic archbishops of Braga
University of Coimbra alumni
Portuguese Roman Catholic archbishops